Navajo Dam is a census-designated place  in San Juan County, New Mexico, United States. Its population was 253 as of the 2020 census. Navajo Dam has a post office with ZIP code 87419. The community is located in the vicinity of Navajo Dam.

Demographics

Education
Navajo Dam is divided between Bloomfield Municipal Schools (the majority) and Aztec Municipal Schools (a minority section). Bloomfield High School  and Aztec High School are the high schools of the former and latter, respectively.

References

Census-designated places in New Mexico
Census-designated places in San Juan County, New Mexico